Chris Clemence (born March 17, 1986) is an American bassist, songwriter, and music producer and is best known for his work with Bad Blood as well as a solo artist. He previously was a member of Adelitas Way, RapScallions, and Screaming At Demons.

Biography
Clemence grew up in East Hampton, New York

Career
Chris has co-written several hit songs including "California Brain" which earned him his first platinum video game award for its feature in "Rocksmith" on Xbox and PlayStation. "California Brain" charted at #70  and was #10 in the Top 25 Songs about California among Rihanna, Britney Spears, and Death Cab For Cutie. "Got Your Love Comin'" was iHeart Radio's featured "Music You Should Know" on over 65 Clear Channel radio stations. His latest hit "Can You Feel It" has become a worldwide sports anthem, airing in the stadiums of many NHL, NFL, NBA, and MLB teams during their games. "Can You Feel It" was also played at the World Cup 2014, The Stanley Cup Finals 2015, and Super Bowl XLIX. The song has since been featured in the new Carl's Jr. All Natural Burger campaign  and Chris performed it live on CBS during David Letterman for the Mercedes-Benz Music Minute  as well as on FOX Sports for the San Diego Padres' Opening Day in PETCO Park. Chris is endorsed by Warwick, Gallien Krueger, D'Addario, Planet Waves, and Chuck Taylor All-Stars and has toured internationally, sharing the stage with Chad Smith of Red Hot Chili Peppers, Jack White, Chris Cornell, Scorpions, Warrant, Sheryl Crow, Demi Lovato, Fishbone, English Beat, Red Jump Suit Apparatus, and Mike Posner.

At the 2014 Grammy Awards, Chris and Wendy Starland were named in the Top 30 Hottest Couples on the Red Carpet.

On October 6, 2015 Chris and Screaming At Demons released the single "Rockstar" on VEVO . The song directly benefits the Homeless Rockstars charity through United Way

On October 22, 2015 Loudwire broke the news that Chad Smith of the Red Hot Chili Peppers would be featured on the upcoming Screaming At Demons singles "Our Time" and "All Of Me" The releases are expected for early 2016.

On September 23, 2016 it was announced that Clemence is currently writing a New York anthem that will be the official song for the NY Rangers, NY Giants, and NY Knicks with Cro Mags founder Harley Flanagan, and Madison Square Garden DJ Ray Castoldi that will be released Fall of 2016.

In the November 2016 issue of Rolling Stone Magazine, Chris was featured for his new single "Let's Go" which is now the NY Sports Anthem for the New York Giants, Rangers, and Knicks

References 

Living people
1986 births
21st-century American bass guitarists